The massacre of Uus street was committed by German forces and local collaborators on 30 August 1941 in Tallinn, Estonia.

History 
German forces occupied Tallinn on 28 August 1941 after the Soviet evacuation of Tallinn. The German occupation forces included a local Omakaitse militia. Einsatzgruppe A commanded by Franz Walter Stahlecker closely followed the German front units, actively recruiting local nationalists and antisemitic groups to instigate pogroms against the local Jewish population.

In Tallinn, many Jews lived in the vicinity of the Uus street, located in Vanalinn. Several Jewish shopowners had their businesses on the street. On the night before 30 August, the area was targeted by a Omakaitse unit under the command of Karl Talpak. Militiamen arrived to the street with torches and burned down several shops owned by the Jews. The Jewish residents were taken out to the street and left waiting for the arrival of the Einsatzgruppe that had orders to execute them.

According to the testimony of local Estonian resident Martin Aidnik, the victims were ordered to undress and some who resisted were beaten to death:

According to most evidence, the Einsatzgruppe murdered 83 Jewish victims by machine-gun fire on the Uus street. They were later buried in an unmarked grave outside the city.

Later, commander of the German commando reported to Stahlecker:

The massacre was followed by taking the remainder of the Jewish population in Tallinn to several concentration camps in Estonia such as the Jägala concentration camp, where they were killed toward the end of the year 1941.

Citations and references

Cited sources
 
 

Einsatzgruppen
1941 in Estonia
August 1941 events
Massacres in 1941
Uus steet
Local participation in the Holocaust
The Holocaust in Estonia
Uus street
Uus street
20th century in Tallinn
1941 murders in the Soviet Union